Shpend Hasani (born 24 March 1996) is a German footballer who plays as a forward for FC Wegberg-Beeck.

Career
Hasani made his professional debut in the Eerste Divisie for Helmond Sport on 5 August 2016 in a game against MVV Maastricht.

References

External links
 
 

Living people
1996 births
People from Heinsberg
Sportspeople from Cologne (region)
German people of Kosovan descent
German footballers
Footballers from North Rhine-Westphalia
Association football forwards
Eerste Divisie players
Alemannia Aachen players
Helmond Sport players
FC Wegberg-Beeck players
German expatriate footballers
German expatriate sportspeople in the Netherlands
Expatriate footballers in the Netherlands